Yousef Haikal (1907–1989) was a Jordanian Ambassador and the Mayor of Jaffa between 1945 and 1948.

Biography 
Haikal was born in 1907 in the city of Jaffa. After learning at the Arab College in Jerusalem, he sought degrees in Montpellier, Paris and the University of London, before returning to Mandatory Palestine in 1938. He served as theGeneral Inspector of Awqaf (Muslim public properties in Palestine) for four years, and then as a District Judge in Nablus between 1943 and 1945, When Haikal was appointed Mayor of Jaffa by Mandatory authorities. 18 months after becoming mayor, Haikal held an election for Mayor which he proceeded to win.

In February of 1948, during the Palestine war, Haikal contacted David Ben-Gurion through a British intermediary trying to secure a peace agreement with nearby Tel Aviv, which was opposed by the commander of the city's Arab militia. In May, Haikal fled the city for Jordan.

In 1949, Haikal was appointed Jordanian Minister to the United States, In August of 1952, he became Jordan's representative at the International Monetary Fund. He held both positions until December of 1953. and December of 1953. He subsequently led the Jordanian Delegation with the Jordan–Israel Mixed Armistice Commission in Jerusalem between 1953 and 1954. He subsequently served as Jordan's ambassador to the United Kingdom between 1954 and 1956, to France between 1956 and 1957, to the United States In 1957 and then again in 1959, to India between 1962 and 1964 and to the Republic of China between 1964 and 1969. Haikal also served as Jordan's Permanent Representative to the United Nations between 1957 and 1962.

After retiring from his Diplomatic posts, Haikal moved to Lebanon and wrote a memoir. He died in 1989 and was buried in Amman.

References

1907 births
1989 deaths
Ambassadors of Jordan to the United States
Ambassadors of Jordan to the United Kingdom
Ambassadors of Jordan to France
Ambassadors of Jordan to India
Ambassadors of Jordan to Taiwan